The Griquas (often confused with !Orana, which is written as Korana or Koranna) are a subgroup of mixed race heterogeneous former Khoe-speaking nations in Southern Africa with a unique origin in the early history of the Dutch Cape Colony. Under apartheid, they were given a special racial classification under the broader category of "Coloured". They are Cape Coloureds who participated in the Great Trek, forming “Griqua States” (the Coloured Afrikaans equivalent of "Boer States", which were White Afrikaans states formed after the Greak Trek).

Similar to the Trekboers (another Afrikaans-speaking group of the time), they originally populated the frontiers of the nascent Cape Colony (founded in 1652). The men of their semi-nomadic society formed commando units of mounted gunmen. Like the Boers they migrated inland from the Cape and in the 19th century established several states in what are now South Africa and Namibia.

Griqua was the name given to a mixed-race culture in the Cape Colony of South Africa, around the 17th and 18th century (Taylor, 2020). They were also known as Hottentots before Europeans arrived into their lands where they lived as close-knit families. They are a racially and culturally mixed people who are primarily descended from the intermarriages and sexual relations between European colonist men and primarily Khoikhoi slaves. The Griquas could trace their forefathers to two clans, the Koks and Barendse, the first made up mainly of Khoikhoi and the second of mixed European descent. Genetic studies of the 21st century have shown these people also had Tswana, San, and Xhosa ancestry. Later, the Europeans chose mixed-race women of the Khoikhoi, who were living in the Cape during the 17th and 18th centuries. As time went on, mixed-race people began to marry among themselves, establishing a distinct ethnic group that tended to be more assimilated to Dutch and European ways than tribal peoples in separated villages. During apartheid, the Griqua were racially classified under the broader category of "Coloured" (Taylor, 2020).

Slavery was practised in the Dutch East India Company-controlled Cape Colony, and the mixed-race groups which developed in the early Cape Colony as a result of white settler interaction with captured Khoe people who began to work around the farms, eventually opted different names for themselves, including Bastards, Basters, Korana, Oorlam or Oorlam Afrikaners, and Griqua. Like the Afrikaners, or "Boers" as they were known in that time, many of these groups migrated inland when the British took over the colonial administration. The word "Afrikaner" itself was originally (for over 350 years) used as a description for not white Boers but a mixed-race bastard child. Note that the name Baster and Bastards were not derived from the English word "bastard", but rather the Dutch word meaning "hybrid". 

It was only around 1876 that a group of Boer intellectuals, who named themselves "The fellowship of real Afrikaners", decided to use the term as a new means to describe the Boer peoples, as part of the project to create a new national identity for pioneer Boer people during the First and Second Boer Wars and for more powerful political legitimacy. This is why today many Afrikaans-speaking white people are still known as Afrikaners, as this message was powerfully conveyed as a national identity during the times of the South African Union (1910–1961) and the apartheid years of the Republic of South Africa.

According to the 18th-century Dutch historian Isaak Tirion, the Khoi name Griqua (or Grigriqua) is first recorded in 1730 in reference to a group of people living in the northeastern section of the Cape Colony. In 1813, Reverend John Campbell of the London Missionary Society (LMS) used the term Griqua to describe a mixed-race group of Chariguriqua (a Cape Khoikhoi group), Bastaards, Korana, and Tswana living at the site of present-day Griekwastad (then known as Klaarwater). The British found their "proud name", Bastaards, offensive, so the LMS called them Griqua. The term Bastaards refers to a group of people of mixed origin (Jody, 2021).

The actual name was derived from the Chariaguriqua people whose princess became the wife of the first Griqua leader, Adam Kok I (Taylor, 2020). Adam Kok was a liberated slave, who figured out how to acquire burgher rights and a ranch close to the present Piketberg, established the most incredible blended local area. Because of a common ancestor named Griqua and shared links to the Chariguriqua (Grigriqua), the people officially changed their name to the Griqua.

History

Origin and early history 

The Boers arrived in the area of Griquatown after Natal was taken over by the British. They acquired land from the Griqua, buying it in exchange for horses, liquor, firearms and ammunition. Trouble started when the Kok arrested a Boer accused of ill-treating his people, and the trekker community tried to take over his entire territory. A British force stationed at Colesberg quickly crossed the Orange River and defeated the Boers at Zwartkoppies.

The arrival of the Boers and the colonial masters to the area known as Griqualand West denied the Griquas the opportunity of following their own development paths. They lost their land and traditional resources, and were tossed into a sea of rapid social change which saw them lose the independence they had searched for in the Orange Free State area.
The Dutch East India Company (VOC) did not intend for its Cape Colony possessions at the southern tip of Africa to develop into a political entity. As the colony expanded and became more successful, its leadership did not worry about its frontiers. As a result, the frontier of the colony was indeterminate and ebbed and flowed at the whim of individuals. While the VOC undoubtedly benefited from the trading and pastoral endeavours of the Trekboers, it did little to control or support them in their quest for land. The high proportion of single Dutch men led to many taking indigenous women as wives and companions, producing mixed-race children. These multiracial offspring gradually developed as a sizable population who spoke Dutch and were instrumental in developing the colony.

These children did not attain the social or legal status accorded their fathers, mostly because colonial laws recognised only Christian forms of marriage. This group became known as Basters, derived from bastaard, the Dutch word for "bastard" (or "crossbreed"). As part of the European colonists' paramilitary response to insurgent resistance from Khoi and San peoples, they conscripted Basters men into commando units. This allowed the men to become skilled in lightly armed and mounted skirmish tactics. But many recruited to war chose to abandon Dutch society and strike out to pursue a way of life more in keeping with their maternal culture. The resulting stream of disgruntled Dutch-speaking marksmen leaving the Cape hobbled the primarily Dutch colonists' ability to crew commando units. It also created belligerent, skilled groups of opportunists who harassed indigenous populations along the Orange River. Once free of colonial rule, these groups referred to themselves as Oorlam. In particular, the group led by Klaas Afrikaner became notorious for its exploits. They attracted enough attention from the Dutch authorities that Afrikaner was eventually rendered to the colony and banished to Robben Island in 1761.

Hemmy Gysbert in his Latin oration delivered to the Hamburg Academy on 10th April 1767 describes the Hottentots thus,
This race of men has a good physique, is swift of foot, and averse to hard labour: the majority of them succumb to old age, except those who fall victim to weapons or wild beasts. In colour they are dark rather than black. They are tall and thin, yet so powerful they can withstand the charge of an ox in full career. Their eyes are beautiful but watery, their noses flattened, their breath foul-smelling. Their teeth are ivory white. Their fingers are equipped with little talons, like the claws of eagles. They have graceful ankles and small feet. Their hair is like wool and adorned with pendants or coral' and numerous types of trinkets, made of lead, copper or brass. The great majority of them go about naked or wearing sheepskins they call "Krossen", and which they wear instead of clothing, their private parts they cover with a loin cloth, known as the Kul-Kross. The woman have pendulous breasts, which they can throw over their shoulders and offer to their babies. The chief ornaments of the women are in the form of beads. To protect themselves against the heat of the sun they anoint their faces and bodies with an unguent made of animal fat, butter and soot. Some of them live off the raw flesh of animals, the rest eat it half-cooked, dragging the flesh through their teeth.

Griqua migrations 

The Griquas settled on the outskirts of the Cape Colony, since they were neither European or African. They formed their own communities and spoke Afrikaans. The Griqua surnames were predominantly Afrikaans and are still common in the coloured community today. Many of the Griqua men enlisted to do commando service. However, the Griquas were constantly being removed off their land as the Europeans took preference over them. This caused the Griquas to move away from the Cape colony in search of their own land. This migration was in two main groups the Kok and Barends families.

One of the most influential of these Griqua groups was the Oorlam. In the 19th century, the Griqua controlled several political entities which were governed by Kapteins (Dutch for "Captain") and their councils, with their own written constitutions. The first Griqua Kaptein was Adam Kok I, a former slave who had bought his own freedom. Kok led his people north from the interior of the Cape Colony, likely to escape discrimination, before moving north again. As Voortrekker moved North to Natal and finding out the Natal was under British control, they had remembered the good lands they had passed through so they moved back over the Drankensberg [O'Connel, 2013].

He eventually led them beyond the Cape Colony, near the Orange River just west and south of what would eventually become the Boer Republics of the Orange Free State and Transvaal, respectively. This area is where most of the tribe settled, although some remained nomadic. Prior to beginning their migrations, the Griqua had largely adopted what would be known as the Afrikaans language.

Adam Kok, head of the Griquas at Nomansland, on the demand of the teacher John Campbell, concocted the name Griqua. They set up a fundamental arrangement of government dependent on pioneers known as kaptyns and officers drawn from the main families. However, Kok had a rival known as Nicholas Waterboer, he ruled the farthest west of Kimberley. He was no threat to Kok until diamonds were discovered there. Kok's successor, Andries Waterboer, founded Griqualand West, and controlled it until the influx of European after the discovery of diamonds. In 1834, the Cape Colony recognised Waterboer's rights to his land and people. It signed a treaty with him to ensure payment by Europeans for the use of the land for mining.

Another important founding father of the Griquas was Barend Barends. He led a group of Griquas to fight against Milakazi at Moordkop in the North West Province. The battle led to the deaths of many griquas. Barends was no match for Milikazi and many of the Griqua soldiers died during this battle. Trudie (Barends Granddaughter) was captured by Milikazi and forced to join Milikazi as his harem. It is rumoured that she was later rescued by a missionary, Robert Moffet. It is believed that Griqua blood runs through the Ndebele people from the children that Trudie bore during her years with Milikazi.

Current situation 

Despite similarly mixed-race origins, those Coloured peoples identifying as Basters are considered to be a separate ethnic group and live primarily in south-central Namibia, while those who consider themselves Griqua are mostly located around Campbell and Griquatown in the historic territory of Griqualand West in the Northern Cape; around the small Le Fleur Griqua settlement at Kranshoek in the Western Cape; and at Kokstad in KwaZulu-Natal.

Due primarily to the racial policies of South Africa during the apartheid era, many Griqua people accepted classification in the larger "Coloured" group for fear that their Griqua roots might place them at a lower level than other groups. As a result, estimates of the size of the Griqua population are difficult to determine and remain largely unknown.

Genetic evidence indicates that the majority of the present-day Griqua population is descended from a combination of European, Khoikhoi and Tswana ancestors, with a small percentage of San, or Bushmen, ancestry.

In 1999, the National Khoi-San Council (NKC) was established and facilitated discussions between these indigenous people and the South African Government. They discussed and collaborated on many issues concerning the Khoi-San people. Griqua people are represented by the National Khoisan Consultative Conference (Afrikaans: Nasionale Khoe-San Oorlegplegende Konferensie), which was established in Oudtshoorn in 2001 to represent the interests of South Africa's Khoisanid peoples. The conference participates in cooperative research and development projects with the provincial government of the Western Cape and the University of the Free State in Bloemfontein. Members of the influential Le Fleur clan of Griqua are especially represented in this body.

The Griqua established their own church, known as the Griqua Church, which is Protestant. The Church has a strong focus on maintaining Griqua cultural and ethnic identity. They are represented mostly in South Central Namibia.

One of several disputed theories as to the origin of Bloemfontein's name connects it to the Griqua leader Jan Bloem (1775–1858). However, this may be a coincidence as Bloemfontein is Dutch for "fountain of flowers", or "blooming fountain", and the area could have been named for its local vegetation.

Griqualand 

Several areas of South Africa became known as 'Griqualand' when the group migrated inland from the Cape and established separate communities. The Griqua were first from the Cape to make their way to and remain in the Transorangia area, beyond the Orange River.

Griqualand East, officially known as New Griqualand was one of four short-lived Griqua states in Southern Africa from the early 1860s until the late 1870s and was located between the Umzimkulu and Kinira Rivers, south of the Sotho Kingdom.Is the area around Kokstad on KwaZulu-Natal's frontier with the Eastern Cape. It was a historical division in the Eastern Cape province approximately 19000 km2. This area was named after Adam Kok III. In 1861–1862, Kok III led more than 2,000 Griqua through Basutoland over the Drakensberg mountains. They settled on a piece of unclaimed territory between Pondoland and Natal which subsequently became known as Griqualand East. The region remained independent for a few years before the territory was annexed by Britain. Griqua descendants are now largely concentrated in Kokstad, where the Griqua Church is a center of the community.

Griqualand West is the area around Kimberley, which became an important mining town in the decades following the first local discovery of diamonds in 1866. Kimberley is also known for its sports teams, including the Griquas rugby team, which competes in South Africa's annual Currie Cup tournament and contests its home matches at Griqua Park. With the arrival of the Boers to Griqualand West, the Griqua lost their land and traditional cultures and were tossed into a rapidly changing Orange Free State area [South Africa History Online, 2020].

The Griqua nation - Map indicating Griqualand West is known to have made use of flags before 1902 when they adopted a flag similar to the Zuid Afrikaansche Republiek (ZAR). Griquas living in this area were under the leadership of Anndries but they are not known to have used flags.

Griqua people 

 Adam Kok III
 Adam Kok I
 Barend Barends
 Andries Waterboer
 Andries Le Fleur

Afrikaans Literature 

 Barend Barends (2019)

die vergete kaptein van Danielskuil

See also 

 Afrikaners
 Basters
 Cape Coloureds
 Coloureds
 Griqua coinage
 Hapa
 Khoisan
 Mestizo
 Mulatto
 Oorlam

References

External links 

 "Children of the Mist – the lost tribe of South Africa"
 Kokstad with historical Griqua images*
 Kranshoek – meeting with Griqua Paramount Chief le Fleur
 Griquatown and Campbell with historical Griqua images
 Griquatown – 1812 and today
 History of the Rehoboth Basters and the Griqua in Maps and Pictures 
 
 https://www.sahistory.org.za/article/griqua
 http://www.griquas.com/gr01.htm

 
Afrikaner diaspora
Cape Colony people
Coloured South African people
Dutch diaspora in Africa
Ethnic groups in South Africa
Articles containing video clips